The following is the final results of the Iran Super League 2002/03 basketball season.

Regular season

 Farsh and Gol Gohar relegated to Division 1.

Playoffs

 Sanam qualified to WABA Champions Cup 2004.

All-Superleague team
All-Superleague 1st team
 Javad Davari (Zob Ahan)
 Iman Zandi (Zob Ahan)
 Pouya Tajik (Paykan)
 Samad Nikkhah Bahrami (Sanam)
 Behzad Afradi (Sanam)

All-Superleague 2nd team
 Mohammad Reza Eslami (Paykan)
 Mohammad Inanloo (Homa)
 Mahmoud Khosravi (Sanam)
 Saman Veisi (Sanam)
 Karam Ahmadian (Sanam)

References
 Asia-Basket

Iranian Basketball Super League seasons
League
Iran